Frank Troup (27 September 1896 – 19 January 1924) was an English cricketer. He played for Gloucestershire between 1914 and 1921.

References

1896 births
1924 deaths
English cricketers
Gloucestershire cricketers
People from Mussoorie
British people in colonial India